Pashanda Pandit is a Bengali drama film directed by Shibaprasad Sen and produced by Ratna Sen based on a 1961 same name novel of Narayan Sanyal. This film was released 1993. Soumitra Chatterjee played the role of main protagonist of the film.

Plot
Pandit is Sanskrit teacher of a school. He is widower having a daughter lives in a village. While he tries to marry a lady named Shanti to take care of his girl properly he was insulted and beaten up by local goons. Scandals spread out against him locally. Students and teachers insult him regularly. Pandit leaves the job, returns to his own village and starts a school for women. But local party leader tries to use Pandit for his political mileage. While he disagrees the leader tortures and rapes Pandit's only daughter.

Cast
 Soumitra Chatterjee as Pandit
 Anusuya Majumdar
 Manoj Mitra
 Arun Bandyopadhyay
 Chitrangada Bose
 Nilima Biswas
 Trishna Chakraborty

References

External links
Pasanda Pandit in pdf

1993 films
1993 drama films
Bengali-language Indian films
Indian drama films
Films based on Indian novels
1990s Bengali-language films
Films based on works by Narayan Sanyal